Jamie Moloney is an Irish hurler who plays for Tipperary Senior Championship club Drom-Inch and at inter-county level with the Tipperary senior hurling team. He won an All Ireland with Tipperary as a panellist in 2019.

Career
Moloney made his senior debut for Tipperary on 25 January 2020, coming on as a substitute in the opening round of the 2020 National Hurling League against Limerick in a 0-18 to 2-14 defeat.

References

Living people
Tipperary inter-county hurlers
Year of birth missing (living people)